King Bhumibol Adulyadej of Thailand died at the age of 88 on 13 October 2016 (B.E. 2559), after a long illness. A year-long period of mourning was subsequently announced. A royal cremation ceremony took place over five days at the end of October 2017. The actual cremation, which was not broadcast on television, was held in the late evening of 26 October 2017. Following cremation his remains and ashes were taken to the Grand Palace and were enshrined at the Chakri Maha Phasat Throne Hall (royal remains), the Royal Cemetery at Wat Ratchabophit and the Wat Bowonniwet Vihara Royal Temple (royal ashes). Following burial, the mourning period officially ended on midnight of 30 October 2017 and Thais  resumed wearing colors other than black in public.

Illness and death

King Bhumibol Adulyadej had been treated at Siriraj Hospital since 3 October 2014. The king had a high fever due to sepsis, which improved following antibiotics treatment. Until 28 September 2016, King Bhumibol developed a low grade fever as a consequence of pneumonitis and required further treatment with antibiotics. The king subsequently developed organ failure owing to hypotension and became dependent on hemodialysis due to kidney failure. King Bhumibol's condition became significantly unstable due to evolving acute hepatitis.

The king died at Siriraj Hospital on 13 October 2016 at 15:52 local time. The Bureau of the Royal Household officially announced his death at 18:45, less than 3 hours after the actual time of his passing, although Scottish journalist and author Andrew MacGregor Marshall reported the death several hours before the official announcement by the royal palace.

Reactions

Funeral

On 14 October 2016, the body of the late king was carried by an autocade from Siriraj Hospital to the Grand Palace. His body left Gate 8 of the hospital around 16:30. As the cortege passed Arun Ammarin Road, Phra Pin Klao Bridge, and Ratchadamnoen Road, crowds of Thais, most clad in black and many openly sobbing, paid homage. Led by Somdej Phra Vanarata (Chun Brahmagutto), the abbot of Wat Bowonniwet Vihara, the autocade entered the palace via Thewaphirom Gate. Upon arrival at the palace, the body was given the bathing rite, presided over by the late king's son, King Vajiralongkorn. The event was live broadcast on television by the television pool of Thailand.

The general public were allowed to take part in a symbolic bathing rite in front of the king's portrait at Sahathai Samakhom Pavilion within the Grand Palace later that day.

Lying in State
The king's body lay in state at the Dusit Maha Prasat Throne Hall of the Grand Palace for a period of one year, with daily rites for a period of 100 days. As in the funerals of the king's mother and sister, the king's body was not physically placed in the royal funerary urn (kot) as was customary; instead, the coffin which housed the body was placed behind the pedestal displaying the royal urn. Special rites attended by King Vajiralongkorn were held to mark the 7th, 15th, 50th and 100th days since the king's death. After the 15th day, the public were allowed to pay their respects and attend the lying-in-state in the Grand Palace. By the end of the allowed public attendance on 30 September 2017 (later pushed forward to 5 October the same year), over 12 million people had paid their respects in person, a historic record crowd that, including foreign tourists and expats living in Thailand, broke all-time attendance records and left an estimated 890 million Thai baht in donations for the royal charity activities.

The foreign dignitaries who attended the lying-in-state or paid respect at the Grand Palace were as follows (by order of their visit):

Special nationwide services in all Buddhist temples together with a general 100th day memorial service were held to mark the 100 day mark since his death on 20 January 2017 with King Vajiralongkorn presiding over the national service.

On 28 February 2017, a special Royal Kong Tek (Gongde) ceremony was held, presided by King Vajiralongkorn at the Dusit Maha Prasat Throne Hall and was led by monks from the Thai Chinese Buddhist community in the Bangkok area. The service was in keeping with Chinese Buddhist rites and customs regarding the dead. The Kong Tek ceremony was a Buddhist religious ceremony unique to the Chinese wherein the deceased, together with his personal effects and clothing, was transferred ceremonially to the next life, with special prayers and chants sung by monks. The event was unprecedented since it was the first time such a ritual was held for any member of the Thai royal family in an official capacity.

Cremation

The public square Sanam Luang used as the cremation ground, where the construction of an elaborate, temporary crematorium was started in early 2017 and took only 8 months to complete. The government granted one billion baht, deducted from central budget, to cover the construction. Once the cremation is over, the crematorium opens for public visits for a month before being torn down in January 2018.

Designs for the cremation complex were officially unveiled on 28 October 2016, and a special ceremony was held on 19 December for the royal funeral chariots to be used at the Bangkok National Museum. The construction work for the complex officially commenced on 27 February 2017 with the building of the central column with a September target completion date. The crematorium was the biggest, largest and tallest yet since the state cremation rites for King Rama V (Chulalongkorn) in 1911.

On 19 November the Ministry of Culture's Fine Arts Department head Anant Chuchote visited Nakhon Pathom, where the royal funeral urns have been manufactured for centuries out of old sandalwood trees. He asked for public support and assistance for the making of the royal urn alongside 150 artisans from the Traditional Arts Office. The department issued a job hiring call in the middle of January 2017 for prospective workers in the Sanam Luang royal crematorium complex and for the needed chariot repair and upgrading works.

As of 12 February 2017, the government pavilion and the Buddhist chapel were under construction. Concurrently, the Royal Thai Army began manufacturing a new royal cannon chariot for the state cremation ceremonies, a first after many years, timed to be completed in April 2017 for delivery to the Fine Arts Department of the Ministry of Culture. The designs of the buildings combine both Thai traditional and modern building design and construction methods.

The construction process for the royal crematorium (Phra Merumas (Golden Crematorium)) itself commenced with due ceremony on the morning of 27 February 2017 in the Sanam Luang Plaza, in the presence of the Prime Minister of Thailand Gen (ret) Prayut Chan-o-cha. At the right moment, the central steel beam of the building was hoisted using a crane towards its spot in the plaza worksite after a Brahmin blessing was bestowed on it.

By 1 April, the crematorium complex area had seen construction work faster than the usual practice for royal cremations, with all buildings in the middle of the construction phrase earlier than expected. The FAD had also been tasked to undergo a major design remodeling for the main royal urn to be used in the ceremonies and an October date is expected to be chosen for the events. The cannon chariot which was based on those used in British state and royal funerals was officially finished by the end of the month and delivered to the FAD so that the decoration process can begin in time for their debut in the funeral events later in the year.

The national cremation in the Sanam Luang Plaza took place on 26 October 2017, 13 days after the 1st anniversary of the King's death. Just as in past state cremations since 1995, a special Khon performance was held in the plaza grounds, organized by The Foundation of the Promotion of Supplementary Occupations and Related Techniques of Her Majesty Queen Sirikit of Thailand (SUPPORT) and the Bunditphatthanasilpa Institute. Given the huge importance of such an event, the official practice runs for this began as early as 15–16 May with the RTA Ordnance Division spearheading the runs simulating the funeral procession of the major chariots at Saraburi province, with two military vehicles to serve as simulators. For the royal puppet show, it was the first ever to feature a woman performer in keeping with the modern age -  Ancharika Noosingha, 43 years old, who was the first female royal puppeteer in history, keeping a historic tradition from the Ayutthaya period. The Fine Arts Department Royal Music and Drama Office organized the puppet play and its personnel form part of the cast who will perform on the cremation night.

The Nation reported on 11 May that the funeral crematorium and the monastic pavilion are almost ready for an early completion, the fastest yet for royal funerals in the modern era, and the prefabrication processes for the decorations to be used in the buildings are at the final stage. At the same time, the sandalwood corn flowers used for state funerals were made to be used by citizens and foreign attendants attending the services, as the kalamet flowers, protected by law, will only be used in the royal crematorium. The practice of making flowers from corn leaves, through, was a modern practice which began in 1925 during the state funeral of King Vajiravudh (Rama VI).

As of 24 September more than 5,500 people signed up to volunteer to serve during the cremation days. To encourage greater public participation, several Thai provincial capitals had been building replica crematoriums to serve people who cannot be in Bangkok to pay their last respects on the cremation date while both the public and tourists joining the events rode the Bangkok MRT system and the BTS Skytrain lines during the cremation days free of charge, as well as on the public ferries at Khlong Phadung Krung Kasem (Hua Lamphong-Thewarat Market) and Khlong Pasicharoen (Phetchkasem 69-Pratunam Pasicharoen) and the Bangkok BRT. The Ministry of Public Health was expected to deploy huge numbers of medical personnel to serve the public and foreign visitors during these days and provide medical assistance. While social media live reports are prohibited for the TV networks (which broadcast the bilingual coverage of the events via the state Television Pool of Thailand and was aired via satellite and streamed worldwide online in both English and Thai via the official funeral webpage, the RTA Thai Global Network, NBT World and the YouTube channel of Thai PBS, the first time this has ever been done), people will still post live feeds but with difficulty and the national and international press have been given a special media center at the Thammasat University.

In early August, plans were finalized to open the cremation site for public and tourist visitation after the cremation ceremonies.

The Royal Family

Immediate family
 The King, the late King's son
 Princess Bajrakitiyabha, the late King's granddaughter
 Princess Sirivannavari, the late King's granddaughter
 Prince Dipangkorn Rasmijoti, the late King's grandson
 Princess Ubolratana Rajakanya, the late King's daughter
 Ploypailin Jensen and David Wheeler, the late King's granddaughter and grandson-in-law
 Sirikitiya Jensen, the late King's granddaughter
 The Princess Royal, the late King's daughter
 Princess Chulabhorn, the late King's daughter
 Princess Siribhachudabhorn, the late King's granddaughter
 Princess Aditayadornkitikhun, the late King's granddaughter
 Princess Soamsawali, the late King's niece-by-marriage
 Lady Dhasanawalaya Sornsongkram, the late King's niece
 Jitat Sornsongkram, the late King's great-nephew

Absentees
 Queen Sirikit, the late King's widow

Foreign dignitaries attending the funeral 
Foreign Minister Don Pramudwinai said of the 42 countries represented, 24 countries had their royal heads of states, heads of states and royal family members attending the ceremony, and 18 countries will have had their deputy heads of states, government leaders, and special representatives attending the ceremony.

Royal Guests

Others

Timeline of the royal cremation 
 15 May to 29 September - Practice runs for the chariot carriers, drivers and rope holders in Saraburi and later in Bangkok
 23 May - 1st Service of Holy Merit at the Royal Plaza, Bangkok
 9 June - 2nd Service of Holy Merit at the Royal Plaza, Bangkok
 22 August - 3rd Service of Holy Merit at the Royal Plaza, Bangkok
 21 September - National rededication ceremonies for the royal funeral carriages at the Bangkok National Museum
 5 October- Final day for public visitation to the Royal Urn and coffin at the Dusit Maha Phasat Throne Hall of the Grand Palace, Bangkok
 7 October - 1st General practice run of the funeral procession in Bangkok (from the Grand Palace to the Sanam Luang Royal Plaza)
 13 October - National remembrance services in honor of the 1st anniversary of the death of King Bhumibol Adulyadej (Rama IX).
 15 October - 2nd General practice run of the funeral procession in Bangkok
 18 October -  The ceremonial installation of the Royal Nine-Tiered Umbrella over the royal crematorium by King Vajiralongkorn (Rama X)
 21 October - 3rd general practice run of the funeral procession in Bangkok
 22 October - 4th and final practice run of the funeral procession in Bangkok and final practice run for the cremation services
 25 October 
 15:01 (UTC+07:00): Final afternoon and night vigil services before the Royal Urn and Coffin at the Dusit Maha Phasat Throne Hall of the Grand Palace, Bangkok
 26 October - National cremation services
 07:00: Morning services of merit and farewell ceremony of the Royal Urn and Coffin
 09:00 - 14:00: Funeral procession from the Dusit Maha Phasat Throne Hall to the Royal Crematorium at the Sanam Luang Royal Plaza
 16:45: Afternoon memorial merit service
 17:30: Ceremonial first lighting of the funeral pyre and final honours by the 3rd Battalion, 1st Infantry Regiment, King's Own Bodyguard and the 1st Artillery Battalion, King's Guard on behalf of the Royal Thai Armed Forces (three-volley salute and 21-gun salute)
 22:00: Royal cremation proper and outdoor Khon and Nang yai performances, puppet show, musical concert and ballet performance starting at 1800h
 Note: The cremation itself was not broadcast on the Television Pool, nor even was it live streamed as well online, only a press statement released, although the cremation was recorded by mourners and subsequently uploaded on YouTube and Facebook hours after.
27 October: Day of the removal of the royal ashes and relics 
 07:00: Removal of the royal ashes and relics from the crematorium followed by a breakfast service
 08:30: Royal procession of the transfer of the royal ashes and relics to the Dusit Maha Phasat Throne Hall of the Grand Palace and the Temple of the Emerald Buddha 
 28 October
 17:30: Final service of merit before the royal relics and ashes and dinner
 29 October - Official final day of the mourning period
 09:00: Morning service of merit followed by breakfast
 11:00: Departure honors of the royal relics and remains and procession
 11:35: Ceremony of interment of the royal relics to the Heavenly Abode Room, Chakri Maha Prasat Throne Hall of the Grand Palace
 16:00: Departure honors of the royal ashes
 17:40: Interment service of the royal ashes at the Royal Cemetery at Wat Ratchabophit followed by a procession to the Wat Bowonniwet Vihara Royal Temple and a final memorial interment service

Broadcast schedule for the Television Pool of Thailand 
was livestreamed both in Thai and English via the official funeral website and FB page, NBT World and the Thai PBS and Channel 9 MCOT HD YouTube pages
 Wednesday, 25 October
 14:00 (UTC+07:00): Official beginning of the marathon bilingual coverage
 15:01: Final afternoon and night vigil services before the Royal Urn and Coffin at the Dusit Maha Phasat Throne Hall of the Grand Palace, Bangkok
 Thursday, 26 October
 07:00: Morning services of merit and farewell ceremony of the Royal Urn and Coffin 
 09:00 - 11:30: Funeral procession from the Dusit Maha Phasat Throne Hall to the Royal Crematorium at the Sanam Luang Royal Plaza
 16:50: Afternoon memorial merit service
 17:31: Ceremonial first lighting of the funeral pyre and final honours by the 3rd Battalion, 1st Infantry Regiment, King's Own Bodyguard and the 1st Artillery Battalion, King's Guard on behalf of the Royal Thai Armed Forces (three-volley salute and 21-gun salute)
 18:00: Outdoor Khon and Nang yai performances, puppet show, musical concert and ballet performance
 Spilt coverage across all channels and online:
  Outdoor Khon and Nang yai performances: Channel 9 MCOT HD, RTA Channel 5 and Thai Global Network, TNN24, Spring News, Voice TV, Nation TV, Amarin TV and PPTV
 Puppet show and Lakhon nai: Channel 3, Thai PBS and Thai PBS YouTube, Thairath TV, New TV, Workpoint, Now26, True4u and Thai Parliament Television
 Musical concert and ballet: NBT and NBT World, Channel 7, Channel 8, Mono TV, One Channel, GMM25 and Bright TV 
 22:01: Royal cremation proper(As stated earlier, not broadcast by the Television Pool nor live streamed)
 Friday, 27 October
 07:00: Removal of the royal ashes and relics from the crematorium followed by a breakfast service
 08:30: Royal procession of the transfer of the royal ashes and relics to the Dusit Maha Phasat Throne Hall of the Grand Palace and the Temple of the Emerald Buddha 
 Saturday, 28 October
 17:00: Final service of merit before the royal relics and ashes and dinner
 Sunday, 29 October -  Official final day of the mourning period
 09:00: Morning service of merit followed by breakfast
 11:00: Departure honors of the royal relics and remains and procession
 11:35: Ceremony of interment of the royal relics to the Heavenly Abode Room, Chakri Maha Prasat Throne Hall of the Grand Palace
 16:00: Departure honors of the royal ashes
 17:40: Interment service of the royal ashes at the Royal Cemetery at Wat Ratchabophit followed by a procession to the Wat Bowonniwet Vihara Royal Temple and a final memorial interment service

Full order of the funeral procession towards Sanam Luang

From the Deva Phirom gate towards the southeastern end of the Grand Palace walls 
 Two cavalry troopers from the Royal Thai Police
 Prakhom band from the Bureau of the Royal Household and 4 Court Brahmins from Devasathan Temple
 Clapper
 Gen (Rtd) Prayut Chan-o-cha, RTA, the Prime Minister of Thailand and representatives of the national royal funeral committee and Gen Thanchaiyan Srisuwan, RTA, the Chief of Defence Forces
 Parade commander and staff
 The Royal Funeral Palanquin  (Phra Saliang Kleebbua) carrying the designated representative of Ariyavongsagatanana IX, the Supreme Patriarch of Thailand, carried by 16 servicemen of the Royal Thai Army
 Royal regalia and flower bearers
 Standard bearer of the Royal Flag of King Bhumibol Adulyadej (Rama IX)
 The Triple-Poled Royal Funeral Palanquin Carriage (Phra Yannamat Sam Lam Khan) carrying the symbolic Royal Urn, handled by 60 servicemen of the RTA and escorted by 48 Royal Guards and 16 pole bearers carrying gold and silver flower offerings, 8 on each side of the palanquin
 Delegation of the Royal Family of Thailand escorted by personnel of the 1st Infantry Regiment, King's Own Bodyguard
 Royal Standard Bearers (The War Flags of Garuda and Hanuman)
 King Maha Vajiralongkorn (Rama X)
 Princess Maha Chakri Sirindhorn, the Princess Royal 
 Princess Bajrakitiyabha 
 Princess Sirivannavari Nariratana 
 Prince Dipangkorn Rasmijoti
 Royal pages and assistants to the Royal Family
 Chirayu Isarangkun Na Ayuthaya, Lord Chamberlain of the Royal Family and Household of Thailand
 Massed military bands of the 1st Division, King's Guard, First Army, RTA

From the Wat Pho Temple to the Royal Crematorium at the Sanam Luang Royal Plaza 
 Two cavalry troopers from the Royal Thai Police
 1st Massed military bands of the 1st Division, King's Guard, First Army, RTA
 Band of the 1st Battalion, 1st Infantry Regiment, King's Own Bodyguard
 Band of the 3rd Battalion, 1st Infantry Regiment, King's Own Bodyguard
 Band of the 1st Battalion, 11th Infantry Regiment, King's Guard
 Regimental Band of the Chulachomklao Royal Military Academy 
 Parade commander and staff
 1st Guards Regiment (Cadets)
 1st Battalion, Chulachomklao Royal Military Academy Cadet Regiment, King's Guard (Cadet students of the Royal Military Academy)
 1st Battalion, Naval Cadet Regiment, King's Guard (Cadet students of the Royal Naval Academy)
 1st Squadron, Air Cadet Regiment, King's Guard (Cadet students of the Royal Air Force Academy)
 Prakhom band from the Bureau of the Royal Household and 4 Court Brahmins from Devasathan Temple
 Royal horses and their handlers
 The Supreme Patriarch's Minor Royal Carriage (Ratcharoth Noi) carrying the designated representative of Ariyavongsagatanana IX, the Supreme Patriarch of Thailand, carried by 74 RTA servicemen and escorted by 16 fan holders, 8 on each side
 Royal regalia and flower bearers
 Gen (Rtd) Prayut Chan-o-cha, RTA, the Prime Minister of Thailand and representatives of the national royal funeral committee, and Gen Thanchaiyan Srisuwan, RTA, the Chief of Defence Forces
 Standard bearer of the Royal Flag of King Bhumibol Adulyadej (Rama IX)
 The Grand Royal Funeral Carriage/Royal Great Victory Carriage (Phra Maha Phichai Ratcharoth) carrying the symbolic Royal Urn, pulled by 216 servicemen of the RTA and escorted by 48 Royal Guards and 16 pole bearers carrying gold and silver flower offerings, 8 on each side of the wheeled chariot
 Delegation of the Royal Family of Thailand escorted by personnel of the 1st Infantry Regiment, King's Own Bodyguard
 Royal Standard Bearers
 King Maha Vajiralongkorn (Rama X)
 Princess Maha Chakri Sirindhorn, the Princess Royal
 Princess Bajrakitiyabha
 Princess Sirivannavari Nariratana
 Royal pages and assistants to the Royal Family
 Chirayu Isarangkun Na Ayuthaya, Lord Chamberlain of the Royal Family and Household of Thailand
 Other officials of the BRH
 2nd Massed military bands of the 1st Division, King's Guard, First Army, RTA
 Representatives of schools and business establishments with royal patronage and of the late King's royal projects
 2nd Guards Regiment
 2nd Battalion, 1st Infantry Regiment, King's Own Bodyguard
 5th Battalion, 11th Infantry Regiment, King's Guard

Procession circumbulating Royal Crematorium at Sanam Luang 

Prakhom band from the Bureau of the Royal Household and 4 Court Brahmins from Devasathan Temple
 Clapper
 Gen (Rtd) Prayut Chan-o-cha, RTA, the Prime Minister of Thailand and representatives of the national royal funeral committee and Gen Thanchaiyan Srisuwan, RTA, the Chief of Defence Forces
 Parade commander and staff
 The Royal Funeral Palanquin  (Phra Saliang Kleebbua) carrying the designated representative of Ariyavongsagatanana IX, the Supreme Patriarch of Thailand, carried by 16 servicemen of the Royal Thai Army
 Royal regalia and flower bearers
 Standard bearer of the Royal Flag of King Bhumibol Adulyadej (Rama IX)
 The Royal Funeral Gun Carriage (Rajarot Puen Yai) carrying the symbolic Royal Urn, handled by 60 servicemen of the RTA and escorted by 48 Royal Guards and 16 pole bearers carrying gold and silver flower offerings, 8 on each side of the gun carriage
 Delegation of the Royal Family of Thailand escorted by personnel of the 1st Infantry Regiment, King's Own Bodyguard
 Royal Standard Bearers (The War Flags of Garuda and Hanuman)
 King Maha Vajiralongkorn (Rama X)
 Princess Maha Chakri Sirindhorn, the Princess Royal
 Princess Ubolratana Rajakanya
 Princess Soamsawali
 Princess Bajrakitiyabha
 Princess Sirivannavari Nariratana
Prince Dipangkorn Rasmijoti
Princess Siribhachudabhorn
Princess Aditayadornkitikhun
Khun Ploypailin Jensen and Mr. David Wheeler
Khun Sirikitiya Jensen
 Royal pages and assistants to the Royal Family
Chirayu Isarangkun Na Ayuthaya, Lord Chamberlain of the Royal Family and Household of Thailand
 Massed military bands of the 1st Division, King's Guard, First Army, RTA

Mourning 

The government declared a year-long mourning period for Bhumibol. Citizens were asked to refrain from participating in "joyful events" and entertainment for 30 days following his death; as a result, a number of events, including sports (such as the Thai League football season, which ended entirely), were cancelled or postponed. Entertainment outlets such as cinemas, nightclubs and theatres announced that they would shut down or operate under reduced hours during this period. The mourning period prompted concerns from Thailand's tourism industry, which felt that the mood of the country, as well as the cancelled events, would reduce interest in visiting Thailand.

Upon the announcement of his death, all television channels suspended regular programming and simulcast special programmes from the television pool of Thailand, which consisted of videos and photos of Bhumibol, and coverage of royal events. International channels were blacked out and replaced by this programming, and all programming during this time was carried exclusively in monochrome. Following the funeral procession on 14 October 2016, the channels continued to air the pooled tribute content until midnight local time, after which they were allowed to resume regular programming in colour. However, for the remainder of the 30-day mourning period, all broadcasters were forbidden from broadcasting programmes that featured "any element of entertainment, dancing, joy, violence, impoliteness or overly expressed emotion", nor any non-official information, speculation or criticism related to the deceased King and his successor. Most Thai media outlets and websites switched to greyscale colour schemes as well. After a brief return to monochrome for the King's 1st death anniversary on 13 October 2017, colour television broadcasts, with the same restrictions are before, resumed on 19 October the same year.

Out of respect for the mourning, many Thai malls, including all Central Pattana and The Mall Group properties, chose not to install extensive Christmas displays and decorations for the holiday season. Some installed memorials to Bhumibol instead.

Aftermath
Since the death of the king, ultra-royalists in Thailand have criticized and harassed those who did not wear mourning black. They also subjected to witch-hunts people whom they accused of disrespecting the deceased monarch. On 14 October 2016, angry ultra-royalist groups in Phuket Province thronged the residence of a man who posted on social media a number of comments which they thought offensive to the late king and violated the lèse-majesté law, despite the local police having declared that the comments were not in breach of the law. The groups dispersed after the police agreed to prosecute the man for the crime of lèse-majesté. Similar incidents happened on the following day in Phang Nga Province.

In November 2016, Nangrong School in Buriram Province seized colourful winter jackets from students and required them to wear those in mourning colours only. The students were reportedly distressed to lose their jackets due to the cold weather, and many did not own multiple warm articles of clothing.

On 28 November, the director of a public school in Ranong Province was removed from office for not wearing mourning black on her first day at work.

The National Council for Peace and Order, the junta ruling Thailand, also announced after the death of Bhumibol that it will hunt down lèse-majesté fugitives.

References

Further reading
 
 
 

Bhumibol Adulyadej
2016 in Thailand
Bhumibol Adulyadej
Bhumibol Adulyadej
Bhumibol Adulyadej
Thai monarchy
October 2016 events in Thailand
Funerals in Thailand